Liberty is an unincorporated community in Fauquier County, Virginia, United States, near Remington. It lies at an elevation of 358 feet (109 m).

References

Unincorporated communities in Fauquier County, Virginia
Unincorporated communities in Virginia